Ffair Rhos (also known as Ffair-rhos) is a small village in the  community of Ystrad Fflur, Ceredigion, Wales, which is 63.2 miles (101.8 km) from Cardiff and 167.8 miles (270 km) from London. Ffair Rhos is represented in the Senedd by Elin Jones (Plaid Cymru) and the Member of Parliament is Ben Lake (Plaid Cymru) In Ffair Rhos you can find a Campsite run by two residents who live in the small village  https://penrhiw-campsite.business.site/. You can also find across the road a pub which serve food and drinks to help treat the passing hikers or residents of the town. https://Teifi-inn.business.site/.

References

See also
List of localities in Wales by population 

Villages in Ceredigion